Stictane obscura is a moth in the subfamily Arctiinae. It was described by Hiroshi Inoue in 1976. It is found in Japan.

References

Moths described in 1976
Nudariina